Digital Shades Vol. 1 is the fourth studio album by French electronic group M83. The album was released on September 3, 2007, and features only founding member Anthony Gonzalez. The album consists of tracks that are more of an ambient texture and quality; some songs have light vocals while the album is mostly instrumental. Some tracks even dip into drone music as well which differs vastly from Gonzalez's earlier explorations of dream pop and shoegaze guitar-influenced song structures.

A sequel to the album was released on September 20, 2019, titled DSVII.

Track listing

Personnel
 Written, composed, and performed by Anthony Gonzalez.
 Mixed and mastered by Antoine Gaillet.
 Excerpt in track 8 from the movie soundtrack By the Kiss directed by Yann Gonzalez.
 Artwork and illustration by Laurent Fetis.

References

2007 albums
M83 (band) albums
Mute Records albums
Ambient albums by French artists